Imaginary Enemy or Imaginary Enemies may refer to:

Film and TV
Imaginary Enemy, 2010 documentary on sculptor Liao Yibai
Imaginary Enemies, List of Orange Is the New Black episodes

Music
Imaginary Enemy (album), 2014 album by The Used and a song from that album
"Imaginary Enemy", single by Circa Survive on their album Blue Sky Noise
"Imaginary Enemy", song by Kary Ng from 2006 album With a Boy Like You